The Last Train (Cruel Earth in Canada) is a British six-part serial, a post-apocalyptic drama first broadcast on the ITV network in 1999. It has since been repeated on ITV2 in 1999/2001 and on numerous occasions on the UK Sci-Fi Channel. The serial was written by Matthew Graham and produced for ITV by Granada Television.

The series has not been released on DVD or any other format, and has never aired in the US.

Plot synopsis 
A random group of individuals on a train travelling between London and Sheffield are cryogenically frozen when the train crashes inside a tunnel and a canister of gas being carried by a passenger is released in their carriage. They unfreeze to find the United Kingdom in ruins. Unbeknownst to them, 52 years have passed. They wrongly believe weeks, then months, then just 14 years have passed whilst they were frozen in time before eventually finding out the devastating truth. They are some of the few humans to have survived an apocalyptic asteroid strike and are alone in the British countryside. It is revealed that the passenger with the gas canister, Harriet Ambrose (Nicola Walker), knew of the incoming asteroid strike and had been on her way to a top-secret government project known as Ark.

Harriet wishes to track down the Ark team to find her boyfriend, scientist Jonathan Geddes (Ralph Brown). The rest of the group agrees to join her, since it seems like their best chance to find other survivors and a safe haven. On the way, they must deal with the dangers of the post-apocalyptic world, such as feral dog packs and tribes of seemingly hostile humans... children of the few original survivors.

Cast and crew

Main characters

Supporting cast 
Ordered alphabetically by actors' surnames
 Guard (Roger Bingham) – Episode 1
 Johnathan Geddes (Ralph Brown), Arks chief scientist and Harriet's lover, who gave her the cryogenic canister, government clearance, a security badge/swipe card, and directions to meet at his government bunker and later, at Ark. He appears as Harriet remembers him in a video in Episode 2, and in person having aged 40 years at the end of Episode 6.
 Karen (Joy Carradice) – Episode 6
 Mark (Kenneth Colley), Gillian's father and leader of the Mareby village group; he wants Hild and the train group to stay with him and, to that end, sabotages the van – Episode 5
 Darren (Chris Cook)
 Archie (Robert Dunn) – Episode 1
 Danny (Justin Ellery) – Episode 1
 Gillian (Deborah Findlay), Mark's daughter; she's had several still-born babies – Episode 5
 Sam (John Flitcroft) – Episode 1
 Becky (Abigail Hayes) – Episode 1
 Teenager (Chris Hoyle) – Episode 1
 Miss. Eversleigh (Mary Jones)
 Coats (Josh Moran) – Episode 1
 Behemoth (David Nicholls) – Episode 6 (not credited in episode 5)
 Hornrim (Phil Smeeton) – Episode 6 (not credited in episode 5)
 Midwife (Flo Wilson) – Episode 4

Episodes

Production 
In Canada, the series aired under its working title: Cruel Earth.

The series was written by Matthew Graham, who went on to co-create and write Life on Mars, its spin-off Ashes to Ashes, and the short-lived Bonekickers. He also wrote the episode "Fear Her" for the 2006 series of Doctor Who, as well as two episodes of Hustle.

Settings:
 The railway depot shown in the programme, that is said to be Sheffield railway station, is in fact the derelict Manchester Mayfield railway station in Manchester.
 The church in episode 2 is Gorton Monastery.
 The camp featured in episode 4 is an old Pontin's holiday camp in Prestatyn, North Wales (Tower Beach Holiday Camp).
 The village "Mareby" in episode 5 is Wardle, a small village in Greater Manchester, near Littleborough and Rochdale.
 The Ark structure featured in episode 6 was Thorpe Marsh Power Station, located five miles northeast of Doncaster; it was undergoing demolition at the time.

In the United States, the Fox Network purchased the rights to produce a new version of the series soon after its original 1999 UK transmission. Retitled The Ark, the idea did not progress beyond the pilot stage.

References

External links

Further reading 
 
 
 

ITV television dramas
Post-apocalyptic television series
1999 British television series debuts
1999 British television series endings
1990s British drama television series
Television series about impact events
1990s British science fiction television series
1990s British television miniseries
Cryonics in fiction
Television shows set in England
Television series set in the 2050s
Television series by ITV Studios
Television shows produced by Granada Television
English-language television shows